Georges Schehadé (2 November 1905 – 17 January 1989) was a Lebanese playwright and poet writing in French.

Life and career
Georges Schehadé was born in Alexandria, Egypt, in an aristocratic Greek orthodox family of Lebanese origin but spent most of his life in Beirut, Lebanon. His sister was the novelist, Laurice Schehadé. He studied law at the American University of Beirut and became a general secretary at the Ecole Supérieure de Lettres in 1945.

In 1930, Saint-John Perse published Schehadé's first poems in the literary magazine Commerce. During his first travel to Europe in 1933 he met Max Jacob and Jules Supervielle. After World War II, he frequently stayed in Paris where he sympathized with the Surrealists, especially with André Breton and Benjamin Péret.

Between 1938 and 1951, Georges Schehadé wrote four small books of poetry that Gallimard published in 1952 under the title Les Poésies.

The year before Georges Vitaly produced Schehadé's first play, Monsieur Bob'le, at the Théâtre de la Huchette, and it got very controversial reviews. Most critics didn't like it at all but several poets and actors – amongst them  André Breton, René Char, Georges Limbour, Benjamin Péret, Henri Pichette and Gérard Philipe – were very fond of it and wrote a couple of articles in Le Figaro Littéraire.

In 1954, Jean-Louis Barrault produced his second play, La Soirée des proverbes, that hadn't any success either. Only in 1956, with his third play, Histoire de Vasco (world premièred at Schauspielhaus Zürich), Schehadé wrote a work that was staged all over the world and translated into more than 25 languages. In 1974, the British composer Gordon Crosse (translation and libretto by Ted Hughes) made an opera out of this play: The Story of Vasco, premièred by Sadler's Wells Opera at the Coliseum Theatre in London.

From 1960 to 1965, Schehadé wrote three other plays, Les Violettes (1960), Le Voyage (1961) and L'Emigré de Brisbane (1965) that entered the repertoire of the Comédie-Française in 1967. It was his last play.

In 1985, after a long period of silence, Georges Schehadé published his last book of poetry, Le Nageur d'un seul amour, a collection of poems he had written between the late 1960s and the early 1980s. He died on 17 January 1989 in Paris and was buried in the Cimetière du Montparnasse.

Georges Schehadé was mentioned to have influenced Nassim Nicholas Taleb in Taleb's youth, mentioned the postface of The Bed of Procrustes.

Works

Poetry 

Étincelles, Edition de la Pensée latine, Paris 1928
Poésies I, GLM, Paris 1938
Poésies II, GLM, Paris 1948
Poésies III, GLM, Paris 1949
Poésies Zéro ou L'Écolier Sultan (written in 1928/29), GLM, Paris 1950
Si tu rencontres un ramier (later called Poésies IV), GLM, Paris 1951
Les Poésies (Poésie I–IV), Gallimard, Paris 1952, reprinted in paperback edition Poésie/Gallimard 1969, 2001 and 2009
Poésies V (1972)
Le Nageur d'un seul amour (= Poésies VI), Gallimard, Paris 1985
Poésies VII (last poems), Editions Dar An-Nahar, Beyrouth 1998

Plays 

Monsieur Bob'le, Gallimard, Paris 1951
La Soirée des proverbes, Gallimard, Paris 1954
Histoire de Vasco, Gallimard, Paris 1956
Les Violettes, Gallimard, Paris 1960
Le Voyage, Gallimard, Paris 1961
 L'Émigré de Brisbane, Gallimard, Paris 1965
L'Habit fait le prince (written in 1957), pantomime, Gallimard, Paris 1973

Other works 

Rodogune Sinne ("novel", published in 1942, 1947; written in 1929)
 Goha (screenplay), 1958
Anthologie du vers unique, Ramsay, Paris 1977

External links 
 Georges Schehadé in IMEC (Institut Mémoires de l'Edition Contemporaine)
 The Story of Vasco, latest production in UK

1905 births
1989 deaths
Lebanese male poets
Lebanese dramatists and playwrights
Asian writers in French
People from Alexandria
Writers from Beirut
20th-century Lebanese poets
20th-century dramatists and playwrights
French-language poets
20th-century male writers